The Central District of Lordegan County is in Chaharmahal and Bakhtiari province, Iran. At the 2006 census, its population was 96,483 in 18,689 households. The following census in 2011 counted 110,807 people in 25,084 households. At the latest census in 2016, the district had 105,538 inhabitants living in 27,364 households.

References 

Lordegan County

Districts of Chaharmahal and Bakhtiari Province

Populated places in Chaharmahal and Bakhtiari Province

Populated places in Lordegan County